Aonuma (written: 青沼 lit. "blue swamp") is a Japanese surname. Notable people with the surname include:

, Japanese video game designer
, Japanese women's basketball player
, Japanese manga artist

See also
Aonuma Station, a railway station in Saku, Nagano Prefecture, Japan

Japanese-language surnames